Hongtong County is a county in the southwest of Shanxi Province, China. It is under the administration of the prefecture-level city of Linfen. The county spans an area of 1,494 square kilometers, and has a population of approximately 766,579 as of 2019.

History 
During the reigns of the Hongwu Emperor through the Yongle Emperor, there was a concerted effort to resettle Chinese peasants to the North China Plains, which had been afflicted by conflict and natural disasters shortly before their reigns.

Administrative divisions
Hongtong County is divided into nine towns and seven townships.

Geography 
Lying in the northern end of the Linfen Basin, Hongtong County has an average altitude of 430 meters, with its highest peak, Huoshan, reaching 2,347 meters in elevation. The Fen River runs north to south through the county.

Climate 
On an annual basis, Hongtong County experiences an average temperature of 12.7 °C, 441.5 millimeters of precipitation, and 2079.1 hours of sunshine.

Demographics 
The county's population was 766,579 as of 2019, of which 45.7% of the population lived in urbanized areas, whereas the remaining 54.3% lived in rural areas.

Economy 
As of 2019, Hongtong County has a GDP of 15.15 billion Renminbi. Of this, the primary sector accounted for 6.6% of the economy, the secondary sector accounted for 45.8% of the economy, and the tertiary sector accounted for 47.6% of the economy. Retail sales in 2019 totaled 7.03 billion Renminbi. Residents of Hongtong County had a disposable income of 19,545 yuan per capita, which stood at 30,848 yuan for urban residents, and 13,025 yuan for rural residents.

Major agricultural products in the county include corn, wheat, millet, beans, yams, apples, red dates, and edible nuts.

Major industrial products in the county include coal, coal coke, benzene, refined methanol, cast iron, natural gas, cement, chemical fertilizers, and plastic products.

Education 
Hongtong County has 352 schools, which includes 145 kindergartens, 162 elementary schools, 33 junior high schools, 9 ordinary high schools, and 3 secondary vocational schools.

Culture 
The  retains a high degree of cultural significance, which is visited by about 200,000 tourists each year. The Great Pagoda Tree has become a notable site in Chinese ancestor veneration, with tourists leaving messages at the site for their ancestors, and paying homage to them. The site also hosts large events for the annual Qingming Festival.

Transportation 
By the end of 2019, there were 417 registered taxis, as well as 16 bus lines operational in the county serviced by 223 buses.

Major expressways which run through Hongtong County include National Highway 108, National Highway 309, the G5 Beijing–Kunming Expressway, and the G22 Qingdao–Lanzhou Expressway.

The Datong–Xi'an passenger railway and Datong–Puzhou railway both run through Hongtong County.

References

External links
Official website of the County Government

 
County-level divisions of Shanxi
Linfen